Ayo Bankole (17 May 1935 – 6 November 1976) was a composer and organist from the Yoruba ethnic group in southwest Nigeria.

Early life and education
Ayo Bankole was born in Jos, Nigeria, into a musical family: his father, Theophilus Abiodun Bankole was an organist and Choirmaster at St. Luke's Anglican Church in Jos. His mother was a music instructor for several years at Queen's School, Ede, Osun State, a Federal government high school.

Bankole studied in London at the Guildhall School of Music and Drama. There he met drama student and poet Brian Edward Hurst and set one of Hurst's poems, "Children of the Sun", to music; this was performed at the Guildhall School in 1960. He also studied at Clare College, Cambridge and received a Rockefeller Foundation Fellowship to study ethnomusicology at the University of California, Los Angeles.

Musical career
Bankole returned to Nigeria in 1966 and was appointed Senior Producer in Music at the Nigerian Broadcasting Corporation, Lagos, where he worked until 1969, after which he was appointed lecturer in music at the School of African and Asian Studies, University of Lagos.

He worked as music educator, composer, choral conductor, performer and musicologist with independent choral groups, including the Choir of Angels (students from three high schools in Lagos: Reagan Memorial, Lagos Anglican Girls Grammar School, and the Methodist Girls High School), Lagos University Musical Society, Nigerian National Musico-Cultural Society, and the Chapel of the Healing Cross Choir, all in Lagos. He wrote much Christian liturgical music in the Yoruba language and his compositions show elements of both traditional Nigerian music and Western classical music. He also composed theme songs for some Nigerian television drama series.

Murder
In 1976, Bankole was brutally murdered at the age of 41 with his wife in Lagos by a half-brother.

References

Further reading
Euba, Akin. "Ayo Bankole: A View of Modern African Art Music Through the Works of a Nigerian Composer." In Essays on Music in Africa, no. 1 (1988), pp. 87–117. Bayreuth: IWALEWA-Haus.
Horne, Aaron. Keyboard Music of Black Composers: A Bibliography, Greenwood, 1992. 
Omojola, Olabode F. (1994). "Contemporary Art Music in Nigeria: An Introductory Note on the Works of Ayo Bankole." Africa: Journal of the International African Institute, v. 64, no. 4 (1994), pp. 533–543.
Sadoh, Godwin (2007). Intercultural Dimensions in Ayo Bankole's Music. iUniverse. .

Nigerian composers
20th-century classical composers
1935 births
1976 deaths
Yoruba musicians
Classical organists
Musicians from Lagos
Alumni of Clare College, Cambridge
Alumni of the Guildhall School of Music and Drama
Male classical composers
20th-century Nigerian musicians
People murdered in Lagos
Yoruba academics
Academic staff of the University of Lagos
People from Jos
University of California, Los Angeles fellows
Yoruba-language writers
20th-century organists
20th-century male musicians
1976 murders in Nigeria
Fratricides